Giorgio Paganin (born 24 April 1962) is an Italian speed skater. He competed in three events at the 1984 Winter Olympics.

References

External links
 

1962 births
Living people
Italian male speed skaters
Olympic speed skaters of Italy
Speed skaters at the 1984 Winter Olympics
People from Asiago
Sportspeople from the Province of Vicenza